Loved One is the 10th studio album by Kento Masuda released on 16 April 2014 through Kent On Music, Inc. The album contains fourteen tracks. It was produced by Kento Masuda and Gary Vandy.  Loved One features musicians Paul Messina from Flashpoint and Kevin Marcus Sylvester from Black Violin and utilizes the HQCD process for superior sound quality.

Track listing

Personnel 
 Kento Masuda – composer, engineer, piano, producer
 Paul Messina – flute, horn arrangements, piccolo, sax (alto), sax (tenor), string arrangements
 Kevin Marcus Sylvester – violin

Production
 Gary Vandy  – engineering, mixing, mastering, production
 Richard Maloney – mixing
 Victor Mercader – mixing

Awards and nominations

References

External links

Kento Masuda albums
2014 albums
Concept albums
Instrumental albums